Radio Austria 1 International (Ö1 International) is the official international broadcasting station of Austria.

Austrian Radio 1 (Ö1) is its most successful cultural radio network. It replaced Radio Österreich International which was discontinued for financial reasons at the end of 2003.

The station's transmitters were in Moosbrunn, on the outskirts of Vienna.

Programming
The entire programme offering, with just a few changes, is broadcast worldwide as Ö1 International. This mix of information, culture, music, literature, education, science and religion reaches Austrians living abroad as well as a global audience with an interest in Austria.

Report from Austria
Report from Austria, a 15-minute news and current affairs programme on the air Monday to Friday, keeps the listener up to date on what is happening in Austria with news bulletins, as well as interviews and features from the world of domestic and international politics, business, culture and sports.

Time and frequency
 Monday to Friday: 6:00 p.m. to 6:25 p.m. CET (17:00 to 17:25 UTC), 5.940 MHz
 Monday to Friday: 7 a.m. to 8:20 a.m. CET (06:00 to 07:20 UTC), 6.155 MHz
 Saturday and Sunday: 7 a.m. to 8:10 a.m. CET (06:00 to 07:10 UTC), 6.155 MHz
 Monday to Saturday: 12:00 p.m. to 1:00 p.m. CET (11:00 to 12:00 UTC), 13.730 MHz

See also
 Ö1
 ORF, the Austrian publicly funded broadcaster
 List of international radio broadcasters

External links
 Radio Austria 1 International Website 
 Ö1 Webradio (Live) 

Radio stations in Austria
International broadcasters
Radio stations established in 2003
2003 establishments in Austria
ORF (broadcaster)